Argosy Mountain is an  summit located in Flathead County of the U.S. state of Montana.

Description

Argosy Mountain is located in the Flathead Range, a subset of the Rocky Mountains. It is situated in the Great Bear Wilderness, on land managed by Flathead National Forest. Precipitation runoff from the mountain drains north to the Middle Fork Flathead River via Roaring, Argosy, and Dolly Varden creeks. The nearest higher neighbor is Trilobite Peak,  to the east-southeast. Access to this remote peak is from the nearby Shafer Ranger Station at the Schafer landing strip which was grandfathered with the wilderness designation.

Climate

Based on the Köppen climate classification, Argosy Mountain is located in a subarctic climate zone characterized by long, usually very cold winters, and short, cool to mild summers. Winter temperatures can drop below −10 °F with wind chill factors below −30 °F.

Geology

Argosy Mountain is composed of sedimentary rock laid down during the Precambrian to Jurassic periods.

See also
 Geology of the Rocky Mountains

References

External links
 Weather: Argosy Mountain

Mountains of Flathead County, Montana
Mountains of Montana
North American 2000 m summits
Flathead National Forest